Adenia glauca is a species of flowering plant in the passionflower family, Passifloraceae. It is native to southern Africa, where it occurs in  southeastern Botswana and northern South Africa.

It grows from 0.5 to 3.5 m tall, with its main stem enlarged at ground level.

References

glauca
Flora of Botswana
Caudiciform plants